Henri-Richard Lobe (born 20 June 1945) is a Cameroonian judoka. He competed in the men's middleweight event at the 1980 Summer Olympics.

References

1945 births
Living people
Cameroonian male judoka
Olympic judoka of Cameroon
Judoka at the 1980 Summer Olympics
Place of birth missing (living people)
African Games medalists in judo
Competitors at the 1978 All-Africa Games
African Games bronze medalists for Cameroon
20th-century Cameroonian people
21st-century Cameroonian people